Humphrey St John-Mildmay (1794–1853) was an English merchant banker and politician, a partner with Baring Brothers.

Life
St John-Mildmay joined the Coldstream Guards and served as a captain in the Peninsular War. After marrying Anne Baring, daughter of Alexander Baring in 1823 he was offered a partnership in the family bank. They had one child, Humphrey Francis St John-Mildmay (1825–1866)

St John-Mildmay was also appointed a Director of the Bank of England. He was Conservative MP for Southampton, Hampshire. He spoke and voted against the Slave Trade Suppression Bill in 1843.

He lived at Mount Clare, Roehampton from 1830–32.

References

1794 births
1853 deaths
British Army personnel of the Peninsular War
Coldstream Guards officers
Conservative Party (UK) MPs for English constituencies
Members of the Parliament of the United Kingdom for Southampton
People associated with the Bank of England
UK MPs 1841–1847
19th-century English businesspeople